The Northolt Branch Observatories (NBO; Observatory codes: Z80, Z48 and Z37) is an astronomical observatory located in London, England. NBO collects follow-up astrometry of near-Earth asteroids and other small Solar System objects. It focuses on public outreach, sharing images, videos and information about asteroids on social media.

The two main belt asteroids 72834 Guywells and 128345 Danielbamberger are named after members of the Northolt Branch Observatories team.

History 
Northolt Branch Observatories was founded in 2015, as an extension of the London-based Northolt Branch Astro group of local amateur astrophotographers. It is a British-German collaboration: Data is collected on-site by observers at the telescopes in England, and then processed remotely from Germany.

Activities 
Northolt Branch Observatories is an educational outreach partner with NEOShield-2. It works closely with Asteroid Day and the PACA (Pro-Am Collaborative Astronomy) Project, with the goal to raise awareness about asteroids. In 2016 and 2017, NBO hosted the International Capture The Asteroid imaging contest, in partnership with NEOShield-2. The annual competition is targeted particularly at amateur astrophotographers, who rarely choose to image asteroids in favour of planets or deep-sky objects.

In addition to observing Near-Earth asteroids, NBO also provides supernova confirmation and long-term follow up of comets as part of PACA observing campaigns. Examples of PACA campaigns with contributions from NBO include Rosetta's comet 67P/Churyumov–Gerasimenko, and the comets 41P/Tuttle–Giacobini–Kresák and 45P/Honda–Mrkos–Pajdušáková.

References

External links 
 Northolt Branch Observatories on Facebook
 Twitter
 Astrophiz 23: Meet Asteroid Hunters Daniel Bamberger and Guy Wells
 Astrophiz 50: Asteroid Hunters II
 Comet Watch 2016/07/02: North Meets South, Astronomy.fm podcast
 Comet Watch 2017/07/15: With Guest Jeff Tobak of Northolt Astro
 Asteroid Orbit View, web application by David Rankin (in collaboration with NBO)
 NEODyS observation log
 Northolt Branch Astro
 The PACA Project

Astronomical observatories in England